Herbie Mann Plays is an album by flautist Herbie Mann on the Bethlehem label featuring seven tracks originally released on the 10 inch LP East Coast Jazz/4 (1954) along with four tracks which were recorded in 1956. The CD reissue added three alternate takes.

Reception

Allmusic awarded the album 4 stars noting "This set is a good example of Herbie Mann's early style before he started exploring various types of world musics".

Track listing 
All compositions by Herbie Mann except as indicated
 "Chicken Little" - 3:00 
 "Cuban Love Song" (Dorothy Fields, Jimmy McHugh Herbert Stothart) - 3:16
 "The Things We Did Last Summer" (Sammy Cahn, Jule Styne) - 4:15
 "Deep Night" (Charles E. Henderson, Rudy Vallée) - 3:40
 "Between the Devil and the Deep Blue Sea" (Harold Arlen, Ted Koehler) - 4:05
 "After Work" - 4:07
 "Moon Dreams" (Chummy MacGregor, Johnny Mercer) - 3:29
 "A Spring Morning" - 2:45
 "Scuffles" - 2:57
 "The Purple Grotto" - 2:44
 "My Little Suede Shoes" (Charlie Parker) - 2:43
 "A Spring Morning" [alternate take] - 2:50 Bonus track on CD reissue
 "The Purple Grotto" [alternate take] - 2:57 Bonus track on CD reissue
 "Chicken Little" [alternate take] - 3:11 Bonus track on CD reissue

Personnel 
Herbie Mann - flute
Joe Puma (tracks 2, 4, 7, 9), Benny Weeks (tracks 1, 3, 5, 6, 8 & 10-14) - guitar
Keith Hodgson (tracks 1, 3, 5, 6, 8 & 10-14), Whitey Mitchell (tracks 2, 4, 7, 9) - bass
Lee Rockey (tracks 1, 3, 5, 6, 8 & 10-14), Herb Wasserman (tracks 2, 4, 7, 9) - drums

References 

Herbie Mann albums
1956 albums
Bethlehem Records albums